Nancy Rock is a rock lying 2 nautical miles (3.7 km) west of Flat Top Peninsula, King George Island, in the South Shetland Islands. Named by the United Kingdom Antarctic Place-Names Committee (UK-APC) in 1961 after the American sealing vessel Nancy (Captain Benjamin Upton) from Salem, MA, which visited the South Shetland Islands in 1820–22.

Rock formations of King George Island (South Shetland Islands)